The 1933 Utah State Aggies football team was an American football team that represented Utah State Agricultural College in the Rocky Mountain Conference (RMC) during the 1933 college football season. In their 15th season under head coach Dick Romney, the Aggies compiled a 4–4 record (4–3 against RMC opponents), finished sixth in the conference, and outscored all opponents by a total of 115 to 61. The team won all three of its home games by a combined score of 69 to 0.

Schedule

References

Utah State
Utah State Aggies football seasons
Utah State Aggies football